Jackson Field is a baseball venue in Greeley, Colorado, United States. It is home to the Northern Colorado Bears baseball team of the NCAA Division I Summit League. The facility has a capacity of 1,500 spectators. The field was dedicated in 1952 in honor of Charles N. Jackson, a UNC trustee who helped purchase the land in 1927.

Features 
The field's features include an grass playing surface, a press box, an electronic scoreboard, dugouts, a padded backstop, restrooms, and concessions truck. In the summer of 2019, the field saw a new scoreboard installed as well as batting cages.

See also 
 List of NCAA Division I baseball venues

External links
Northern Colorado Facilities

References 

College baseball venues in the United States
Baseball venues in Colorado
Northern Colorado Bears baseball